Florida's 18th congressional district is an electoral district for the U.S. Congress, located in the Florida Heartland. In the 2020 redistricting cycle, the district was created as a new district, which includes the inland counties of DeSoto, Glades, Hardee, Hendry, Highlands, and Okeechobee, as well as most of Polk County (including Bartow, eastern Lakeland, and Winter Haven) and some of Immokalee in Collier County. The previous 18th district, located in the Treasure Coast, was instead renamed the 21st district.

From 2013 to 2023, the district contained the whole of St. Lucie County and Martin County as well as the northeastern part of Palm Beach County, and included Port St. Lucie, Fort Pierce, Stuart, and Jupiter, as well as Treasure Coast International Airport.

The district is currently represented by Republican Scott Franklin.

History
The 18th district was created as a result of the redistricting cycle after the 1980 Census.

From 2003 to 2012, it was based in South Florida. The district included portions of Miami-Dade and Monroe counties. The Miami-Dade section included most of the city of Miami, the South Beach section of Miami Beach, and many of the southern Miami suburbs, including Coral Gables and Coral Terrace. The Monroe County section of the district included all of the Florida Keys.

Election results from recent presidential races

List of members representing the district

Election results

2002

2004

2006

2008

2010

2012

2014

2016

2018

2020

2022

References

 Congressional Biographical Directory of the United States 1774–present

External links
Rep. Brian Mast's official House of Representatives website

18